Dežanovac is a village and a municipality in Bjelovar-Bilogora County, Croatia. There are 2,715 inhabitants (2011). 58.9% of the population are Croats and 23.1% are Czechs.

References

External links

 

Municipalities of Croatia
Populated places in Bjelovar-Bilogora County